Flowering almond is a common name for several plants and may refer to:

Prunus glandulosa, native to China and present in Japan
Prunus jacquemontii, native to Afghanistan, India, Pakistan, Tajikistan, and Tibet
Prunus triloba

See also
 Prunus tenella, Dwarf Russian Almond, grown as an ornamental plant